Ragged Glory is the 18th studio album by Canadian / American singer-songwriter Neil Young, and his sixth album with the band Crazy Horse. It was released by Reprise Records on September 9, 1990.

Recording 
The Ragged Glory sessions took place in April 1990 at Young's Broken Arrow Ranch. The band played a set of songs twice a day for a couple of weeks (never repeating the same songs in a set), then went back, listened and chose the best takes. According to Young, this approach "took 'analysis' out of the game during the sessions, allowing the Horse to not think".

Music and lyrics 
The album revisits the heavy rock style previously explored on Everybody Knows This Is Nowhere and Zuma. The first two tracks, "Country Home" and "White Line" are songs Young and Crazy Horse originally wrote and performed live in the 1970s (the original recording of "White Line", made for an aborted Homegrown album, would finally see release in 2020). "Farmer John" is a cover of a 1960s song, written and performed by R&B duo Don and Dewey and also performed by British Invasion group The Searchers as well as garage band The Premiers. Young revealed that the song "Days that Used to Be" is inspired by Bob Dylan's "My Back Pages". The album features many extended guitar jams, with two songs stretching out to more than ten minutes.

The closing track, "Mother Earth (Natural Anthem)", uses the melody of the folk song "The Water Is Wide".

Reception and legacy 

In a contemporary review for Rolling Stone, Kurt Loder hailed Ragged Glory as "a monument to the spirit of the garage - to the pursuit of passion over precision" and calling it "a great one". In the Los Angeles Times, John D'Agostino deemed the record "garage rock" and "impressive primitivism coming from a 45-year-old rock icon", while Village Voice critic Robert Christgau called it "an atavistic garage stomp" that "makes good on several potent fantasies--eternal renewal, the garage as underground, the guitar as shibboleth and idea." It was voted album of the year in The Village Voices annual Pazz & Jop critics' poll, and in 2010 it was selected by Rolling Stone as the 77th best album of the 1990s. The album was also included in the book 1001 Albums You Must Hear Before You Die.

The CD single culled from the album, "Mansion on the Hill", included the otherwise unreleased song "Don't Spook the Horse" (7:36). "F*!#in' Up" (pronounced "Fuckin' Up") is frequently covered by Pearl Jam live (see :Category:Pearl Jam Official Bootlegs for recordings), and was performed by Bush in their headlining set at Woodstock 1999. Toronto-based band Constantines recorded a version of "F*!#in' Up" in Winnipeg, which surfaced as the B-side to their "Our Age" 7" in November 2008. Scottish heavy metal band The Almighty recorded the song and included it as a B-side (with an uncensored title) to their "Out of Season" single in 1992. An outtake from the sessions for the album, "Interstate", was released on the vinyl version of the 1996 album Broken Arrow and on the CD single for the track "Big Time". UK Americana band The Whybirds frequently covered the song live.

Smell the Horse
In December 2018 Young revealed in a post on his Archives website that during the process of remastering the album, engineer John Hanlon discovered 38 minutes of unreleased music from the recording sessions (featuring "five songs, with two versions of one, and one long extended take of another"). The expanded set, named Ragged Glory II, was expected to be released on CD, vinyl and Hi-Res audio in 2020 but was delayed. In February 2021, the album was again announced, now titled Smell the Horse, containing all of Ragged Glory as well as "four added tracks", and was set for release later that year, but was eventually pushed back to 2023.

Track listing
All songs written by Neil Young except as noted.

B-sides

Personnel
Neil Young - guitar, vocals
Crazy Horse
Frank "Poncho" Sampedro - guitar, vocals
Billy Talbot - bass guitar, vocals
Ralph Molina - drums, vocals

Charts
Album

Single

Certifications

References

Neil Young albums
Albums produced by David Briggs (producer)
1990 albums
Reprise Records albums
Albums produced by Neil Young
Crazy Horse (band) albums
Garage rock albums by Canadian artists
Grunge albums